Anse Figuier is a quartier of Terre-de-Haut Island, located in Îles des Saintes archipelago in the Caribbean. Located in the Southern part of the island, it is built around a golden sandy beach called Anse Figuier.

Populated places in Îles des Saintes
Quartiers of Îles des Saintes